Rhynchosaurus (beaked lizard) is a genus of rhynchosaur that lived during the Middle Triassic period. It lived in Europe. It was related to the archosaurs, but not within that group. The type species of Rhynchosaurus is R. articeps. Michael Benton named two additional species, R. spenceri and R. brodiei, but they were subsequently renamed Fodonyx and Langeronyx respectively. Fossils of Rhynchosaurus have been found in the Tarporley Siltstone Formation (Mercia Mudstone Group) and possibly the Sherwood Sandstone Group of the United Kingdom.

References

External links 

 Archosauromorpha at Paleofile

Rhynchosaurs
Middle Triassic reptiles of Europe
Anisian genus first appearances
Anisian genus extinctions
Fossils of England
Fossil taxa described in 1842
Taxa named by Richard Owen
Prehistoric reptile genera